Stanley and the Women is a British television drama miniseries starring John Thaw, Samuel West, Geraldine James, Sheila Gish, Penny Downie and Sian Thomas. This series based on the 1984 novel of the same name by Kingsley Amis and adapted for the television by Nigel Kneale and directed by David Tucker, it was produced by Central Independent Television for the ITV network and originally aired in four parts from 28 November to 19 December 1991.

Plot
Stanley Duke works in advertising. He was married to an actress, Nowell, and is now dating Susan, with whom he has a complicated relationship, particularly because of the interference of her mother, Lady D. His son, Steve, suffers a mental breakdown, and Stanley takes him to two psychiatrists. The first, Dr. Collings, is female and too liberated for Stanley; and the second, Dr. Nash, seems to be more interested in drinking than helping his son.

Cast
John Thaw as Stanley Duke
Geraldine James as Dr. Trish Collings
Sheila Gish as Nowell Hutchinson
Penny Downie as Susan Duke
Sian Thomas as Lindsey Lucas
David Lyon as Dr. Cliff Wainwright
Alun Armstrong as Rufus Hilton
Samuel West as Stephen Duke
Donald Churchill as Harry Coote
Michael Elphick as Bert Hutchinson
Dafydd Hywel as Taff Wyndham
Michael Aldridge as Dr. Alfred Nash

Production

Casting
This was Donald Churchill's last acting role before his death on 29 October 1991, before the end of filming the series.

Episodes

Home media
The series of subsequently released on VHS in 1992 and on DVD of the series is now available in 2007 by DD Home Entertainment in the UK.

References

External links

Stanley and the Women at BFI

1991 British television series debuts
1991 British television series endings
1990s British drama television series
ITV television dramas
1990s British television miniseries
Television shows based on British novels
Television series by ITV Studios
Television shows produced by Central Independent Television
English-language television shows
Films based on works by Kingsley Amis
Television shows set in England